Costas Hambiaouris (born 1963) is a Cypriot politician. He served as Minister of Education and Culture from 1 March 2018 until 1 December 2019. In December 2019, he was appointed as the Mountain Communities Development Commissioner.

References

Living people
1963 births
Place of birth missing (living people)
Cyprus Ministers of Education and Culture